Jorge Newbery Airfield, commonly known as Aeroparque, is an international airport  northwest of downtown Buenos Aires, Argentina.

History
The airport was originally proposed by Mayor Carlos Noël in 1925. A number of feasibility studies and zoning disputes followed. In 1938, plans were submitted for an island airport connected via causeway to Avenida General Paz (then under construction). A former wetland reclaimed in 1916 from the Río de la Plata and closer to downtown was selected instead, and the facility, designed by Aeronautics Secretariat engineer Víctor Acuña in 1945, was inaugurated in 1947 as Aeroparque 17 de Octubre (17 October Airfield).

Initially served by a  runway, it began operations in January 1948 as the main hub for domestic flights from Buenos Aires as well as flights to Uruguay. The Argentine Air Force had a small base built near the eastern end of the airport in 1965; at this site, President Isabel Perón was formally deposed by the military in the March 1976 coup.
Plans to merge Newbery with Ezeiza International Airport in a new facility located on an artificial island were revived in 1996 by a commission headed by Congressman Álvaro Alsogaray, though these plans were ultimately dropped. Its operations, like those of all the nation's public airports, were privatized in 1998 and transferred to Aeropuertos Argentina 2000 (part of the conglomerate owned by local businessman Eduardo Eurnekian). Routes were added in March 2010 to destinations in Brazil, Chile, and Paraguay. Work began in 2011 on Terminals III and IV, totaling . These terminals were inaugurated in March 2014, effectively doubling the airport's passenger capacity. However, a recent increase in the number of airlines and flights operating at the airport has brought it to the limit of its capacity. Thus, the government decided to move all international flights (with the exception of those to Uruguay) to Ezeiza Airport from 2019.

Airlines and destinations

Statistics

Accidents and incidents
 On 11 January 1957, LADE Vickers Viking T-11 crashed on take-off. All 35 occupants perished.
 On 30 June 1961, Transcontinental S.A. C-46 Commando LV-FTO crashed on landing approach. Of 35 occupants, 24 died.
 On 17 December 1969, Austral Líneas Aéreas C-46 Commando LV-GEB lost engine 1 due to fuel exhaustion shortly after takeoff. The plane failed to gain height and made a crash landing in a small sport field.
 On 11 May 1975, Vickers Viscount CX-AQO of PLUNA was damaged beyond economic repair when it departed the runway.
 On 7 May 1981, Austral Líneas Aéreas Flight 901, a BAC 1-11, crashed on approach after a flight from Tucumán. All 31 passengers and crew were killed.
 On 24 February 1999, Aerolíneas Argentinas MD-88 LV-VBY was destroyed by hangar fire.
 On 31 August 1999, LAPA Flight 3142, a Boeing 737-200, crashed during takeoff due to pilot error. 63 of the 100 passengers and crew were killed. Two people on the ground were also killed, raising the death toll to 65.

See also 
 Museo Nacional de Aeronáutica de Argentina
 Buenos Aires-Ezeiza International Airport
 List of airports in Argentina
 Transport in Argentina

References

External links

 Official website
 Aeropuertos Argentina 2000
 
 
 

Buildings and structures in Buenos Aires
Airports in Buenos Aires
Airports established in 1947
1947 establishments in Argentina